Ella Elisabet Lemhagen (born 29 August 1965 in Uppsala) is a Swedish film director and screenwriter.  In 2012 she received the honorary award, Gullspira, for her outstanding work in youth culture on the Guldbagge Award (the Swedish equivalent to the Academy awards).

Early life
Lemhagen was born in 1965 in Uppsala and went to Dramatiska Institutets director's program from 1988 to 1991.  Her feature film debut was with Drömprinsen- filmen om Em in 1996.

Career
Lemhagen's first full-length movie was Drömprinsen- filmen om Em which premiered in Swedish cinemas February 1996. It's about a young girl, Em, who one day sees her playhouse burn down. By accident her gaze meets the eyes of the one responsible for the fire whom she later runs into and a new, different friendship begins.

The movie that primarily made Ella Lemhagen known for the public is Tsatsiki, morsan och polisen. It is based on two books written by Moni Nilsson-Brännström called Tsatsiki och morsan and Tsatsiki och farsan. The movie is about an eight-year-old boy who lives with his single mom, his father lives in Greece. Tsatsiki dreams about going there and meet him. He tries to set up his mother with a police who lives in their house but she is not interested. One day Tsatsiki travels to Greece and there he meets his father for the first time.

During the beginning of the 21st century came her big break as a film director for films targeted at adults, not just adolescents. In 2008 she directed a movie called Patrik 1,5 which is about a gay couple who just moved to the suburbs where they bought a house. They are about to adopt a kid called Patrik who is one and half years old. Something goes wrong with the adoption agency and the kid they get to adopt is Patrik who is 15 years old and has a troubled background. It's about the struggle you face as a parent raising a troublesome teenager and their own struggle as a gay couple trying to live a “normal” life.

Her next planned movie is Pojken med guldbyxorna which will premiere in September 2014 on Swedish cinemas. It’s a remake of the book with the same title by Max Lundgren. It is about a boy who gets his hands on a pair of golden pants which gives him an unlimited amount of money.

Filmography
2019 - Jag kommer hem igen till jul
2016 - All Roads Lead to Rome
2014 - Pojken med guldbyxorna
2011 - Kronjuvelerna
2008 - Patrik, 1.5
2003 - Tur & retur
2003 - Järnvägshotellet
2001 - Om inte
1999 - Tsatsiki, morsan och polisen
1997 - Välkommen till festen
1996 - Drömprinsen – Filmen om Em

Awards and nominations
Gullspira 2013 
 The Starboy award for the best children's film at Oulu International Children's and Youth Film Festival in 2000 for Tsatsiki, morsan och polisen.
Guldbagge Award 2000 won for Best director Tsatsiki, morsan och polisen
Guldbagge Award 1997 nominated for Best director Drömprinsen- filmen om Em
Kurt Linder Scholarship 1996 for Drömprinsen- filmen om Em

Bibliography and further reading
 Family, without all the drama by Ann Hornaday, Washington, The Washington Post, 20 August 2010.
 Lyssna och ge förtroende by Eva Westergren, Stockholm, Zoom, edition 8, 1996.

References

External links
 

Swedish film directors
Living people
1965 births
Best Director Guldbagge Award winners
Swedish women film directors
Swedish women screenwriters
Swedish screenwriters